Methylphosphonate synthase (mpnS (gene)) is an enzyme with systematic name 2-hydroxyethylphosphonate:O2 1,2-oxidoreductase (methylphosphonate forming). This enzyme catalyses the following chemical reaction

 2-hydroxyethylphosphonate + O2  methylphosphonate + HCO3−

Methylphosphonate synthase is isolated from the marine archaeon Nitrosopumilus maritimus.

References

External links 
 

EC 1.13.11